Opera North is an opera company based at The Grand Theatre, Leeds, England. This article covers the period during which the Music Director has been Richard Farnes.

History 

Unusually, the 2004–5 season opened with five new productions. One of them, Orfeo ed Euridice, premiered at the Edinburgh International Festival and was subsequently seen at the Monaco Dance Centre in Monte Carlo as well as in Leeds, Newcastle, Nottingham and Salford. It was the company's first collaborative production with a dance company (Emio Greco | PC).

After the Grand Theatre's closure in June 2005 for the commencement of the Leeds Grand Theatre Transformation project, the final three productions in the theatre toured to Hull New Theatre, the Theatre Royal, Norwich, the Lyceum Theatre, Sheffield, and the Grand Opera House, Belfast, as well as the company's regular venues in the North of England. One of these productions was One Touch of Venus, with a libretto by S. J. Perelman and Ogden Nash and music by Kurt Weill, another of the company's trademark performances of musical theatre works.

During the Transformation project, Opera North presented a number of semi-staged and concert performances in venues such as Leeds Town Hall, the Bridgewater Hall, Manchester, Nottingham Royal Concert Hall, Sage Gateshead and Symphony Hall, Birmingham, as well as performances at the Bradford Alhambra and other theatres, including, for the first time, His Majesty's Theatre, Aberdeen.

Phase 1 of Transformation was completed in the autumn of 2006. As well as much-needed renovations to the Grand Theatre itself, it created a permanent home and Opera Centre for Opera North, with two large rehearsal spaces that are the same size as the theatre's stage. The company returned to the theatre in October of that year with new productions of Rigoletto and Peter Grimes. The latter production, directed by Phyllida Lloyd, was garlanded with awards from The South Bank Show, the Royal Philharmonic Society and the Theatre Management Association.

During 2007–8, a mini-festival of operas inspired by William Shakespeare was presented by Opera North. It comprised Verdi's Falstaff and Macbeth, Britten's A Midsummer Night's Dream, Gounod's Roméo et Juliette and Bellini's I Capuleti e i Montecchi. The latter saw the first appearance with the company by Sarah Connolly, who returned in 2010 for Donizetti's Maria Stuarda.

A second phase of Transformation, completed in 2009, focused on restoring the former Assembly Rooms, which originally opened in 1879, as a small-scale performance space managed by Opera North. Now called the Howard Assembly Room, it hosts a variety of musical and other events, one of which was the world premiere performance by Opera North in late 2009 of Jonathan Dove's chamber opera Swanhunter, based on the Lemminkäinen legend.

Opera North's collaborations with other opera companies and festivals during this period included:
 Così fan tutte, a co-production with Glimmerglass Opera, which premiered in Leeds and was also seen at New York City Opera
 Kurt Weill's Der Kuhhandel (Arms and the Cow), a co-production with the Bregenz Festival and the Vienna Volksoper
 Reinhard Keiser's Croesus, a co-production with Minnesota Opera
 Jonathan Dove's The Adventures of Pinocchio, a co-production with Chemnitz Opera

Company visits abroad included taking Julietta and One Touch of Venus to the Ravenna Festival and Skin Deep, Of Thee I Sing and Moscow, Cheryomushki to Bregenz.

Repertoire 
Below is a list of main stage operas performed by the company during this period.

Sources 
Opera North annual review 2004–2005
Opera North annual review 2006–2007
Opera North programmes 2008–11

See also 
 Opera North: history and repertoire, seasons 1978–79 to 1980–81
 Opera North: history and repertoire, seasons 1981–82 to 1989–90
 Opera North: history and repertoire, seasons 1990–91 to 1996–97
 Opera North: history and repertoire, seasons 1997–98 to 2003–04

Opera North
Opera-related lists